City Walk is a paved outdoor pedestrian area in Civic, Canberra. It was formed by the closure to traffic of Alinga Street between East Row in the east (at the City Interchange) and Binara Street (near Casino Canberra) in the south-west, and named City Walk in January 1975. Pedestrians can walk almost the whole way without having to cross any roads with cars on them, except for Akuna Street.

City Walk intersects with Garema Place and Petrie Plaza. Along the walk can be found the Canberra Merry-Go-Round, the Centrepoint arcade, Canberra Centre shopping centre and the Canberra Times fountain.

City Walk often has street performers, and events such as the National Multicultural Festival.

References

Canberra urban places
Shopping districts and streets in Australia
Pedestrian malls in Australia